Kriéger Company of Electric Vehicles (Société des Voitures Électriques Système Kriéger) Manufactured Electric Vehicles in Paris, France from 1898 to 1909.

History 

In 1894  (1868–1951) of Paris, France began designing and building electric automobiles. By 1898, when electric powered vehicle interest increased in France, Kriéger organized the Kriéger Company of Electric Vehicles.

Brougham, Landaulette and Electrolette were three of the models produced. In 1901 43 electric vehicles were produced. In 1902 at least 65 were produced. Kriéger produced or assisted in several racing vehicles including one called 'Powerful' in 1900.

The Electrolette was a two-person vehicle. Next to each front wheel was an electric motor of  each. The pinion comes out at the side next the wheel and engages with a large gear wheel which is fixed against it. The gear and pinion are enclosed in a tight case, thus each wheel is turned independently by its own motor. The  of Fulmen batteries are contained in a box which is fixed in the vehicle below the carriage body and is arranged so that it may be easily slid out from the rear. Kriéger claimed at least  on a single charge.

Kriéger automobiles were pioneers of regenerative electric brakes.  In 1903 Kriéger produced an early hybrid electric vehicle (HEV) with front wheel drive,  power steering and a petrol engine that supplemented the battery pack.

The Kriéger Company manufactured electric vehicles until 1909. Louis Antoine Kriéger continued design work for some time, including the use of the Electrolette name.

Gallery

See also

 List of French cars
 Timeline of motor vehicle brands

References

External links

Electric vehicles introduced in the 19th century
Defunct motor vehicle manufacturers of France
1900s cars
Vehicle manufacturing companies established in 1898
Vehicle manufacturing companies disestablished in 1909
1898 establishments in France
1909 disestablishments in France
Veteran vehicles
1890s cars
Electric vehicles in France
Electric vehicle industry